Rajeshwari Sachdev is an Indian actress who is known for her role in Shyam Benegal's film Sardari Begum (1996), for which she won the 1997 National Film Award for Best Supporting Actress.

Sachdev co-hosted the Zee TV musical show, Antakshari from 1994 to 2001 with Annu Kapoor. In 2005, she along with her husband Varun Badola, took part a reality TV dance competition show, Nach Baliye. She also worked in Crime TV series Rihhaee where she played a role of an activist.

Early life and education

Rajeshwari was born on 14 April 1975, in Mumbai to a Punjabi father and a mother from Southern India.

After completing her graduation from Guru Nanak Khalsa College (King's Circle) in Mumbai, she started her career on stage doing plays with Indian People's Theatre Association (IPTA). She married Varun Badola in 2004.

Career
Sachdev made her film debut with the Marathi film Aayatya Gharat Gharoba (1991), directed by Sachin.

Her second film was Shyam Benegal's Suraj Ka Satvan Ghoda (1992). She then became a regular in his films, and was cast in Mammo (1994), Sardari Begum (1996), Samar (1999), Hari-Bhari (2000), Netaji Subhas Chandra Bose: The Forgotten Hero (2005) and Welcome to Sajjanpur (2008). She also appeared in the Hollywood film Little Buddha (1993) and later in Tales of the Kama Sutra: The Perfumed Garden (1998). She also worked in the show Samvidhaan, directed by Shyam Benegal.

She sang the pop song "Hulle Hullare" in the album of the same name released in 2007.

Sachdev was signed as the lead in TV series Rihhaee replacing actress Divya Dutta who quit the show after shooting for one episode. She is currently playing the role of Mamta Noon in Sony TV's romantic drama series Dil Hi Toh Hai and Kusum Kothari in StarPlus's drama series Shaadi Mubarak.

Filmography

Films

Television shows

References

External links

 
 

Indian film actresses
Indian television actresses
Indian stage actresses
Living people
Actresses in Hindi cinema
1975 births
Actresses from Mumbai
Best Supporting Actress National Film Award winners
20th-century Indian actresses
21st-century Indian actresses
Actresses in Marathi cinema
Actresses in Punjabi cinema
Actresses in Tamil cinema
Indian voice actresses
Indian game show hosts